The 1990 Eurocard Classics (known as such in 1990 for sponsorship reasons) was a tennis tournament played on indoor carpet courts. It was the 1st edition of the event known that year as the Eurocard Classics (previously held as the Stuttgart Classic exhibition event in 1988 and 1989), and was part of the ATP Championship Series, double-week events of the 1990 ATP Tour, running concurrently with the 1990 Ebel U.S. Pro Indoor. It took place at the Hanns-Martin-Schleyer-Halle in Stuttgart, West Germany, from 19 February until 25 February 1990. Second-seeded Boris Becker won the singles title.

Finals

Singles

 Boris Becker defeated  Ivan Lendl, 6–2, 6–2
It was Becker's 2nd singles title of the year, and the 26th of his career.

Doubles

 Guy Forget /  Jakob Hlasek defeated  Michael Mortensen /  Tom Nijssen, 6–3, 6–2
It was Forget's first doubles title of the year, and the 17th of his career.
It was Hlasek's first doubles title of the year, and the ninth of his career.

References

External links
 ITF tournament edition details

Eurocard Classic
Eurocard Open
1990 in German tennis